Amílcar Leonel Suazo is a retired Honduran association football forward who played professionally in Honduras and the United States.

From 1982 to 1988, Suazo played for F.C. Motagua.  In 1988, he moved to the United States and signed with the Washington Diplomats of the American Soccer League.  He scored six league goals that season as the Diplomats won the league title.  Suazo remained with the Diplomats in 1989 and 1990.  In 1990, the team played in the American Professional Soccer League.  In 1994, Suazo played for the Washington Mustangs in the USISL.  He was the eighth leading goal scorer that season.

References

Living people
American Professional Soccer League players
American Soccer League (1988–89) players
F.C. Motagua players
Honduran footballers
Honduran expatriate footballers
Expatriate soccer players in the United States
Honduran expatriate sportspeople in the United States
USISL players
Washington Diplomats (1988–1990) players
Washington Mustangs players
Association football forwards
Year of birth missing (living people)